Kenneth Staelens (born 3 May 1991) is a Belgian professional footballer, who currently plays for Zonhoven United.

Career
Staelens played in his youth for KRC Genk and from 2009 to 2012 on professional side for Dutch club Roda JC Kerkrade in the Dutch Eredivisie. On 13 August 2012 announced his return to Belgium and signed with Esperanza Neerpelt.

References

External links
 
 

1991 births
Living people
Belgian footballers
Roda JC Kerkrade players
Belgian expatriate footballers
Expatriate footballers in the Netherlands
People from Heusden-Zolder
Association football midfielders
Footballers from Limburg (Belgium)